Decanter is a wine and wine-lifestyle media brand. It includes a print and digital magazine, fine wine tasting events, a news website, a subscription website - Decanter Premium, and the Decanter World Wine Awards. The magazine, published in about 90 countries on a monthly basis, includes industry news, vintage guides and wine and spirits recommendations.

History and profile
Following the success of wine columns in British newspapers, the Decanter magazine was founded in London in 1975. Decanter is the oldest consumer wine publication in the United Kingdom. According to author Evelyne Resnick, it has a comparable function in the UK as the Wine Spectator has in the United States. As of 2011, it was published in 91 countries, including China. Columnists and regular contributors include several Masters of Wine.

The magazine focuses mainly on wines available in the United Kingdom, as well as the United States. While it is aimed at consumers, a significant part of the magazine's audience consists both of traders and producers. Its contents include news, topical commentary, travel surveys, interviews, analysis and market reports. Unlike other magazines, which focus on many wines from various regions and countries, Decanter issues offer in-depth reviews of wines from two regions at a time. The readers of Decanter are generally younger than the readers of similar publications, with 41% of readers under 45 years of age.

Decanter launched its website, Decanter.com, in 1999. The website is one of the largest globally, based on traffic figures. In 2017 it launched a subscription service called Decanter Premium.

Decanter World Wine Awards
Decanter World Wine Awards (DWWA) is a wine competition founded in 2004 with over 15,000 entries per year, the DWWA is the world's biggest wine competition. The results of the competition are published on Decanters website and in Decanters August edition.

References

External links
 
 Decanter World Wine Awards official website

Monthly magazines published in the United Kingdom
Magazines established in 1975
Wine magazines
Magazines published in London